Volodymyr Zakharovych Borysovsky was a Ukrainian builder, electrical engineer, politician.

Borysovsky was from Donetsk Oblast. He graduated Igor Sikorsky Kyiv Polytechnic Institute in 1956 and until 1963 worked as an electrician and electrical engineer in Kryvyi Rih. In 1961 he joined the Communist Party of the Soviet Union. In 1963–70 Borysovsky worked at the Dnipropetrovsk regional committee of the Communist Party of Ukraine. He died 11 February 2012.

External links
 Volodymyr Zakharovych Borysovskyi. Igor Sikorsky Kyiv Polytechnic Institute website.
 Volodymyr Borysovsky at the Official Ukraine Today

1933 births
2012 deaths
People from Debaltseve
Central Committee of the Communist Party of Ukraine (Soviet Union) members
Kyiv Polytechnic Institute alumni
Tenth convocation members of the Verkhovna Rada of the Ukrainian Soviet Socialist Republic
Eleventh convocation members of the Verkhovna Rada of the Ukrainian Soviet Socialist Republic
Recipients of the Order of the Red Banner of Labour
Ukrainian electrical engineers
Laureates of the State Prize of Ukraine in Science and Technology
Laureates of the Honorary Diploma of the Verkhovna Rada of Ukraine
Recipients of the Honorary Diploma of the Cabinet of Ministers of Ukraine